Vigdis Songe-Møller (born 1 April 1949) is Professor of Philosophy at the University of Bergen.

Songe-Møller's Philosophy without Women was a feminist exploration of ancient philosophy. Her own experience as a pregnant woman – for whom "the Parmenidean idea of all things existing ultimately as one and self-identical is, to say the least, far from self-evident" – led her to investigate connections between "the Greek philosophers' ideals of unity, self-identity and eternity and their attitudes towards sexuality, reproduction and sexual difference."

Works
Philosophy without Women: the birth of sexism in Western thought, Continuum, 2002

References

1949 births
Living people
Norwegian feminists
Academic staff of the University of Bergen
Norwegian classical scholars
Norwegian women academics
Norwegian women philosophers
Feminist philosophers
Scholars of ancient Greek philosophy
20th-century Norwegian philosophers
21st-century Norwegian philosophers